Stefanie Vögele was the defending champion, but lost in the semifinals to Katarina Zavatska.

Zavatska went on to win the title, defeating Ulrikke Eikeri in the final, 6–4, 6–4.

Seeds

Draw

Finals

Top half

Bottom half

References

Main Draw

Grand Est Open 88 - Singles